Donald Dawson was an American lawyer.

Donald Dawson may also refer to:

Donald A. Dawson, Canadian mathematician
Don Dawson, in 1953–54 MJHL season